The CMC Zinger (originally the Mitsubishi Zinger before 2015) is a compact MPV designed by Mitsubishi Motors in conjunction with the China Motor Corporation from Taiwan, based on the chassis of the Mitsubishi Pajero Sport, and sold in Taiwan from  24 December 2005.

Overview
The name derives from a "person or something full of energy and vitality". From 2007 until 2016, it has also been marketed in the Philippines as the Mitsubishi Fuzion, as the company claims it "merges together the best characteristics of [three] vehicles, the sporty character and ruggedness of an SUV, the spaciousness and versatility of a van, and riding comfort of a passenger car".

The first month's sales were 2,285, substantially exceeding the 1,200/month initial target. The companies planned to expand into mainland China in the second half of 2007 when a joint-production venture between CMC and South East (Fujian) Motor Co., Ltd. came onstream.

The automatic model engine was replaced by a 4G69 MIVEC-equipped version at the end of 2008, in order to meet new emissions standards. The 5-speed manual model still uses the 4G64 engine.

Rebadge and discontinuation outside of Taiwan
In Taiwan, from 2015 the Zinger received a mild facelift, and was transferred into a product branded as CMC following the recent change of CMC repositioning itself as a domestic Taiwanese car brand. The facelift includes CMC logo replacements and the signature CMC front grille and bumper design.

The Mitsubishi Fuzion was removed from the Mitsubishi Philippines website in 2016. The Xpander, which is built at Mitsubishi Motors Krama Yudha Indonesia served as the replacement to the Fuzion and the Adventure due to the engine not meeting Euro 4 standards and some safety issues. The Xpander was not exported to China and Taiwan markets due to Mitsubishi's decision was to decline release of Mitsubishi Xpander and distribute to China Motor Corporation.

As of September 2020, a 2-door pickup variant of the CMC Zinger was available in the Taiwanese market. The compact pickup features a  bed with a  payload capacity. The Zinger pickup is based on the 2019 facelift Zinger model with everything before the B-pillars shared with the station wagon body style. This is mated to a 5-speed automatic gearbox sourced from Hyundai and rear-wheel drive.

References

Crossover sport utility vehicles
Zinger
Cars of Taiwan
Mid-size sport utility vehicles
Rear-wheel-drive vehicles
Cars introduced in 2005
2010s cars